Waters Corporation is a publicly traded analytical laboratory instrument and software company headquartered in Milford, Massachusetts. The company employs more than 7,800 people, with manufacturing facilities located in Milford, Taunton, Massachusetts; Wexford, Ireland and Wilmslow, Cheshire. Waters has Sites in 35 countries globally including Frankfurt, Singapore, India, Germany and in Japan.

Waters markets to the laboratory-dependent organization in these market areas: liquid chromatography, mass spectrometry, supercritical fluid chromatography, laboratory informatics, rheometry and microcalorimetry.

History 

The business was started by James (Jim) Logan Waters as Waters Associates in an office in the basement of a police station in Framingham, Massachusetts, in 1958.

Waters enrolled in the V-12 Navy College Training Program, an officer training program, and graduated from Columbia University as an ensign with a B.S. degree in Physics in 1946. After stints as a university math teacher, Naval officer, project engineer, and entrepreneur, Waters formed Waters Associates in 1958. The fledgling firm's first offices were in the rented basement of the Framingham, Mass. police station.
During these years, Waters Associates was what is now referred to as a research boutique. Companies would contract Waters and his five employees to build one-of-a-kind instruments for various purposes. Early products included a boiler feedwater flame photometer, a balloon hydrometer, a nerve gas detector, a lab refractometer and process control refractometers. While from its start the company had been self-financed, with proceeds from an earlier business sale, Waters opened Waters Associates to external ownership in 1962.

The company's first major break came when Dow Chemical bought one of Waters’ first gel permeation chromatography instruments, Dow Chemical made an additional investment of $400,000. By 1979, Dow Chemical had attained nearly 25 percent ownership in Waters.

In 1967, the ALC 100, the first Waters LC system, was brought to market. According to Leslie S. Ettre in a review about Jim Waters, the LC system was formally introduced at the 1968 Pittsburgh Conference. It was a benchtop system equipped with a Milton Roy pump, syringe injection, and two detectors: a Waters differential refractometer and a UV detector from the Laboratory Data Control (LDC) Co.

In 1969, Dimitri D’Arbeloff, then president of Millipore Corporation, joined the corporation's board of directors. Millipore's venture capital subsidiary made a $600,000 equity investment in Waters.

Waters next big break came in 1972 when Dr. Helmut Hamberger, chief post-doc for Nobel Laureate Dr. Robert Woodward of Harvard University, sought Jim Waters’ help to the first synthesis of vitamin B12. Dr. Hamberger wanted to purify the positional isomers, which were needed to give him the right compound for the final stages of the synthesis.  Working with Dr. Hamberger, the pair took two days to develop a separation, five more days to obtain larger columns to scale up the separation, and three more days to prep his material. In the end, the two had isolated and purified 200 mg of the precursor compound.

In 1972, Waters Associates appointed Frank Zenie president. A year later, headquarters moved from Framingham to a semi-rural  site in Milford, Massachusetts. Waters became chairman, and continued in that role until the company merged with Millipore in 1980, and was rechristened the Waters Chromatograph Division. The sought-for synergies between the two companies never materialized, however. And, in 1993, Waters returned to independence under the leadership of Chairman, President, and Chief Executive Officer Douglas A. Berthiaume. 

In 1997 Waters entered mass spectrometry market with acquisition of Micromass for $176 million.

In 2006, Waters acquired Vicam, provider of bioseparation and rapid detection products for improving food safety and quality.

On 11 June 2012, Waters India celebrated its silver jubilee anniversary in India.

In January 2020, Waters acquired Andrew Alliance, an innovator company in specialty laboratory automation technology, including software and robotics.

In September 2020, Waters announced Udit Batra, Ph.D. as the company's President and Chief Executive Officer.

Products 
Waters’ main product brands include: ACQUITY UPLC systems, ACQUITY UPC2 Systems, Xevo mass spectrometry systems, Synapt MS systems, Synapt HDMS systems, XTerra HPLC columns, XBridge columns, ACQUITY UPLC columns, Alliance HPLC systems, Empower chromatography and MassLynx mass spectrometry software, Oasis sample preparation products, NuGenesis lab management system (LMS).

Sources of Revenue 
A majority of the company's revenue is derived from the life science market, a market comprising drug discovery, drug development, quality control, and the emerging sciences of genomics, proteomics and biopharmaceuticals. Waters products are also sold into the food and beverage, environmental, fine chemical, personal care product, university, government, semiconductor, clinical and plastics markets sectors.

See also 
 Laboratory equipment

References

External links

Andrew Alliance website
Vicam website

Companies listed on the New York Stock Exchange
Life science companies based in Massachusetts
Companies based in Worcester County, Massachusetts
Companies based in Massachusetts